Wilesia "Lele" Hardy (born September 6, 1988) is an American former professional basketball player. She won the Icelandic championship with Njarðvík in 2012, when she was also named Úrvalsdeild Playoffs MVP, and was named the Úrvalsdeild Foreign Player of the Year three years in a row, from 2012 to 2014. She won the Icelandic Basketball Cup with Njarðvík in 2012 and in 2014 with Haukar while also being named the Cup Finals MVP.

Hardy played three seasons in the Naisten Korisliiga, leading the league in scoring in 2016.

Professional career

England
Hardy's first professional stop was with the Nottingham Wildcats of the then top-tier English Women's Basketball League. She helped the club reach the English EBL semifinals and for the season she averaged 20,1 points and 10,3 rebounds.

Iceland
Hardy won the Icelandic national championship in 2012 with Njarðvík, while also being named the playoffs MVP, and the Icelandic cup two times; with Njarðvík in 2012 and Haukar in 2014. She led the league in rebounds for four straight years (2012–2015) while leading the league in scoring for the 2013–2014 season. She finished second in scoring in 2015 and third in 2012 and 2013.

Finland
In August 2015, Hardy signed with Vimpelin Veto in the Finnish Naisten Korisliiga league. In her first season she led the league in scoring with an average of 22,6 points per game.

She spent the 2017–2018 season with Tapiolan Honka, helping the club finish second in the league.

Return to Iceland
On June 30, 2018, Hardy returned to Iceland and signed with Haukar as a player and assistant coach to Ólöf Helga Pálsdóttir. In her first game back, Haukar lost in the Super Cup to Keflavík, 77–83, despite Hardy's 23 points. On 20 February 2019, Haukar announced that Hardy would not finish the season with the team but would continue in her capacity as a coach for the junior teams. In 20 games she averaged 21.4 points, 14.4 rebounds and 5.7 assists.

Career statistics

College

Naisten Korisliiga

|-
| style="text-align:left;"| 2015–2016
| style="text-align:left;"| Vimpelin Veto
| 15 || – || 35.3 || .468 || .257 || .693 || 11.9 || 3.8 || 3.9 || 0.7 || 22.6 || –
|-
| style="text-align:left;"| 2016–2017
| style="text-align:left;"| Vimpelin Veto
| 27 || – || 32.6 || .439 || .214 || .620 || 9.6 || 5.4 || 3.1 || 0.3 || 17.8 || –
|-
| style="text-align:left;"| 2017–2018
| style="text-align:left;"| Tapiolan Honka
| 33 || – || 31.5 || .404 || .274 || .662 || 13.6 || 3.7 || 2.8 || 0.5 || 15.1 || –

Notes

External links
Úrvalsdeild player profile
 Eurobasket.com profile
WNBA.com: Prospect: Lele Hardy
Korisliiga player profile

1988 births
Living people
American expatriate basketball people in Finland
American expatriate basketball people in Iceland
American women's basketball players
Clemson Tigers women's basketball players
Sportspeople from Spartanburg, South Carolina
Úrvalsdeild kvenna basketball players
Haukar women's basketball players
Haukar women's basketball coaches
Njarðvík women's basketball players
Njarðvík women's basketball coaches
Forwards (basketball)